"Loved" is a song recorded by Kim Wilde as a "new" track for the compilation album The Very Best of Kim Wilde, released in 2001.

The song was co-written by Ricki Wilde and Terry Ronald.

The dance track was remixed and released in several of its remixed forms as a single across continental Europe, to some degree of success. New remixes of Wilde's 1980s hits "Kids in America" and "View From a Bridge" were also found on some formats of the single.

Chart performance

See also

References

2001 singles
Kim Wilde songs
Songs written by Ricky Wilde
Songs written by Terry Ronald
2001 songs
EMI Records singles